Dr. Alexander Frick (18 February 1910 – 31 October 1991) was a political figure from Liechtenstein.

Earlier life

From 1929 until 1936 he was a civil servant for the Liechtenstein fiscal administration, becoming director in 1936 and serving until 1945. In 1931 he founded the Scouts of Liechtenstein. From 1935 until 1937 he served as chairman of the National Olympic Committee of Liechtenstein.

Prime Minister of Liechtenstein

He was the Regierungschef (head of government) of Liechtenstein from 3 September 1945 until 16 July 1962, serving as a member of the Progressive Citizens' Party.

Subsequent roles and honours

In 1961 he was awarded a doctorate honoris causa from the University of Fribourg.

Following his service as head of the government, he became deputy of the Diet from 1966 until 1974. He served as its President of the Landtag from January 1966 until December 1969. 

In 1957, Frick was awarded the Grand Decoration of Honour in Silver with Sash for Services to the Republic of Austria.

Family

His son Hansjörg Frick was a member of the government from 2001 until 2005.

See also

 Politics of Liechtenstein

References

External links

Time archive article

1910 births
1991 deaths
Heads of government of Liechtenstein
Speakers of the Landtag of Liechtenstein
Members of the Landtag of Liechtenstein
Progressive Citizens' Party politicians
Recipients of the Grand Decoration with Sash for Services to the Republic of Austria
Scouting in Liechtenstein
Scouting pioneers